Paul McHugh may refer to:
Paul McHugh (legal scholar), New Zealand academic lawyer
Paul R. McHugh (born 1931), American psychiatrist, researcher, and educator
Paul McHugh (cyclist) (born 1967), English cyclist